Secop GmbH (formerly known as Danfoss Compressors GmbH) is a manufacturer of hermetic compressors for cooling circuits. Secop designs, develops, manufactures and distributes compressors for two application ranges: light commercial refrigeration systems and cooling solutions for the mobile area (12/24/48 volt DC compressors).
According to the manufacturer, the compressors are characterized by low energy consumption, low noise emission and environmental friendliness due to the use of CFC-free refrigerants.

The headquarters of Secop are located in Flensburg/Germany, where approximately 31 employees (as of March 2020) work in research and development, the sales division and the product support department. Secop also operates production facilities in Slovakia and in the People's Republic of China, a research center in Austria and worldwide sales and customer service companies.

On April 25, 2017, Japanese company Nidec has signed an agreement to acquire Secop. On September 9, 2019, Secop was acquired by the ESSVP IV fund, advised by Orlando Management AG, and became a stand alone company again.

History 
Under the name of Danfoss Compressors GmbH (temporarily Danfoss Household Compressors GmbH), the current company Secop was part of the Danfoss Refrigeration & Air Conditioning Division of Danfoss A/S until 2010. The group headquarters are located in Nordborg/Denmark.

On 29 November 2010, the Danfoss Group concluded the formal and legally binding separation from this segment of its compressor program. Danfoss Compressors GmbH was taken over by the Munich industrial holding company Aurelius AG. As a close partner of the Danfoss Group, Secop still continues to market its compressor-solutions via the Danfoss Sales Network.

The companies did not disclose the value of the transaction. According to estimates made by the media, the deal was relatively small for Danfoss: Danfoss is one of Denmark's largest industrial companies with an annual turnover of more than 3.4 billion euros (at the time of the transaction) and 26,000 employees worldwide. For Aurelius (turnover 2009: 760 million euros) the takeover was regarded as a major growth step. Dirk Markus, CEO of Aurelius, stated: "We are delighted that the Danfoss Group (...) decided to sell another subsidiary to Aurelius."

The acquisition by Aurelius contained the complete operations in Germany, China, Slovenia and Slovakia with a total of approximately 3,000 employees. As part of the acquisition Danfoss Compressors was renamed and from then on conducted its business with a new brand under the name Secop.
So the Secop GmbH is a newly formed company that can look back on a history of more than 60 years.

Times of crisis 
Even before the takeover by Aurelius, measures were taken to counteract financial crises and to counteract the decline in sales. In 2005 Danfoss already issued a press release in which years of loss-making production of household compressors were criticized and the plan to cut the workforce in half was announced. In 2009 Danfoss Board member Kim Fausing reported weekly losses of millions of euros due to sales declines. 
Between 2005 and 2010 the staff in Flensburg was cut down from 1,450 to 200. The compressor production was relocated to Slovakia and China in 2010.  As mentioned above, only the research and development department, the sales division and the product support remain in Flensburg.

Under Aurelius, the order situation worsened again in July and August 2011. Mogens Søholm, Chief Executive Officer of Secop, informed the public that 20% less compressors had been sold in these months. The introduction of short-time work was the consequence. Søholm explained that this should help spanning the time until the conversion increased again. It was agreed upon that the short-time work was supposed to end in September 2012. After one month of short-time work, in November 2011, a social plan that had been negotiated in 2008 was terminated by years end. Mogens Søholm justified the termination of this plan by saying that the agreement had been made for the Danfoss production staff in 2008 and thus was a contract from another time. The situation lead to uncertainty in the workforce and indignation on the part of the works council and the union.

At the beginning of 2012 Secop announced further layoffs. The approximately 180-strong workforce was again decimated by around 60 people. The employees protested.

Present 
Currently (2021) Secop counts approx. 31 employees in Flensburg. 1,350 people work in the three subsidiaries of the Group worldwide.

On the China Refrigeration Exhibition in April 2013 in Shanghai, 1,146 manufacturers presented their compressors, refrigeration and air conditioning systems. Secop presented the X Series for R600a. The XV received an Innovation Award for its compactness and low weight. Secop itself stated: "Based on a completely new and innovative platform, the XV variable capacity compressor ensures up to 40 % efficiency compared to the highest efficient standard compressors, sets new low noise standards with 32 dB(A), increases useable volume by the revolutionary low height of 100 mm and reduces costs and raw material consumption with its extremely low weight of 4.8 kg."

In April 2013 Secop took over the insolvent company ACC Austria GmbH in Fürstenfeld/Austria for more than 25 million euros. In the course of the bankruptcy of the Italian mother company and a German subsidiary in late 2012, the Austrian compressor manufacturer had been forced to file for bankruptcy as well. In 2012, ACC had accomplished a turnover of approximately 150 million euros. With ca. 700 employees, the company was the largest employer in its home region. Secop declared it wanted to sustain the location as far as possible. At present, ACC employs 500 staffers.

As part of the regulatory approval process, the referral to the European Commission had been completed in September 2013. The acquisition of ACC Austria GmbH by Secop was approved on 11 December 2013.

On August 1, 2017 the whole Secop group was sold by Aurelius and bought by the Japanese stock corporation Nidec for the price of 185 million euros. On August 16, 2018 the name was changed to Nidec Global Appliance Germany GmbH. On June 4, 2019 antitrust concerns about additional acquisitions by the Nidec Corporation in the refrigeration compressor industry led the company to sell off Secop which transitioned to ESSVP IV in September 2019 managed by Orlando Management AG. The transaction was officially completed on September 10, 2019 and from this date forward Secop acted as an independent company again.

At the end of October 2019, it was announced that the Fürstenfeld plant would be closed by March 2020. Production was relocated to China and Slovakia, and 250 employees were laid off. In early April 2020, it was reported that 170 of 300 jobs at the Fürstenfeld site were secured. This was said to be made possible by the sale of Secop's Delta production line to Nidec. There is to be a social plan for the remaining employees. Some were also contracted to work at the new Secop site in Gleisdorf, where Secop opened a new R&D center with 45 jobs in October 2020.In November 2020, Secop celebrated its 10th anniversary and introduced the new management of the company:

Dr. Philipp von Stietencron, Chief Commercial Officer

Dr. Jan Ehlers, Chief Operation Officer

Frank Elsen, Chief Financial Officer

Fabricio Possamai, Chief R&D Officer

According to the company, it underwent heavy restructuring in the year 2020 to make Secop more future-proof. For example, Secop now focuses on two main business areas – Light Commercial and Mobile Cooling. Secop's days as a manufacturer of compressors for the household sector had come to an end with the sale of the Delta production line and the closure of the Fürstenfeld site.

In Mai 2021 Secop appointed Dr. Andreas J. Schmid as CEO. In October of 2021 a new CEO was instated: Dr. Jan Ehlers.

Locations and subsidiaries 

 Note
The figures given in the context of layoffs refer to announced job cuts. The layoffs actually made are not explicitly traceable. Staff numbers are adventitiously the result of reinstatements, termination requested by the employee, pension entrances etc.

External links 
 Website of Secop GmbH

References 

Manufacturing companies of Germany
Companies based in Schleswig-Holstein
German brands
Multinational companies headquartered in Germany